Ectenessa andrei is a species of beetle in the family Cerambycidae. It was described by Martins and Galileo in 1996.

References

Ectenessini
Beetles described in 1996